Humphrey Percy Jones (7 December 1862 – 10 June 1946) was a Welsh footballer who played for Bangor, Swifts, East Stirlingshire, Queen's Park and the Wales national football team.

Jones was born in Bangor and played football the Friars School before moving to play with Bangor F.C. After moving to Bangor, Jones earned his first international cap for Wales in 1885 against England in the British Home Championship. Jones left Bangor to play for Swifts and then moved to Scotland to become a schoolmaster (at Blairlodge School, Polmont) where he played for East Stirlingshire and Queen's Park, also featuring for Corinthian on a regular basis. He made a single appearance for Everton in 1890.

Jones won 14 caps and scored one goal for the Wales national football team between 1885 and 1891. He was the team captain for 13 of these matches, including on his debut.

Jones was one of several Welsh international footballers chosen to referee international matches during the 19th century. He refereed the final match of the 1895–96 British Home Championship between Scotland and England.

International appearances

See also 
 List of Wales international footballers (alphabetical)
 List of Queen's Park F.C. international players

Notes

References 

1862 births
Footballers from Bangor, Gwynedd
People educated at Friars School, Bangor
Welsh schoolteachers
1946 deaths
Welsh footballers
Welsh football referees
Bangor City F.C. players
East Stirlingshire F.C. players
Corinthian F.C. players
Queen's Park F.C. players
Swifts F.C. players
Wales international footballers
Association football wing halves
Association football central defenders
Alumni of Peterhouse, Cambridge